Kaneda is a Japanese surname. Notable people with the surname include:

 Hiroshi Kaneda (born 1953), astronomer
 Masaichi Kaneda (1933–2019), baseball player
 Sekiryo Kaneda (died 1949), president of Nintendo
 Mario Kaneda (born 1976), creator of Girls Bravo
 Tomoko Kaneda (born 1973), voice actress, J-pop singer and radio personality

Fictional characters
 Captain Kaneda, a character in the film Sunshine
 Shotaro Kaneda (Akira), a character in the manga series Akira
 Shotaro Kaneda, a character in the manga series Tetsujin 28-go

See also
Canada (disambiguation)
Kanada (disambiguation)
Kanata (disambiguation)
Kannada (disambiguation)

Japanese-language surnames